Egidijus Bičkauskas (born 29 May 1955) is a Lithuanian politician. In 1990 he was among those who signed the Act of the Re-Establishment of the State of Lithuania.

References
Biography 

1955 births
Living people
Ambassadors of Lithuania to Russia
Members of the Seimas
Place of birth missing (living people)
Signatories of the Act of the Re-Establishment of the State of Lithuania
Vilnius University alumni